The HP LaserJet P3000 series is a series of black and white laser printers printers for small to medium business use. Unveiled in October 2006, they are a direct replacement for the HP LaserJet 2400 series.

Models 
The HP LaserJet P3000 series consists of the following models:

 P3005 (Q7812A)
 P3005d (Q7813A)
 P3005n (Q7814A)
 P3005dn (Q7815A)
 P3005x (Q7816A)

The letters at the end of the model have the following meaning:

 d – this model comes with an automatic duplexer
 n – this model comes with an internal 10/100 BASE-T JetDirect card
 dn – this model comes with all the above
 x – this model comes with all the above plus an additional 500-sheet input tray

See also 
 LaserJet
 List of Hewlett-Packard products

References

P3000 series